Paul Jerrod Pena (January 26, 1950 – October 1, 2005) was an American singer, songwriter and guitarist of Cape Verdean descent.

His music from the first half of his career touched on Delta blues, jazz, morna, flamenco, folk and rock and roll. Pena is probably best known for writing the song "Jet Airliner," a major 1977 hit for the Steve Miller Band and a staple of classic rock radio; and for appearing in the 1999 documentary film Genghis Blues, wherein he displayed his abilities in the field of Tuvan throat singing.

Early years

Pena was born in Hyannis, Massachusetts. His grandparents were from the islands of Brava and Fogo in the Cape Verde islands off the western coast of Africa, and emigrated to the United States in 1919. Pena spoke Cape Verdean Creole with his family while growing up. His grandfather, Francisco Pena, and father, Joaquim "Jack" Pena, were both professional musicians, and taught Paul to play Cape Verdean music, including Morna. Pena performed professionally with his father, including a summer spent in Spain and Portugal, where he studied flamenco music.

Pena was born with congenital glaucoma. He attended the Perkins School for the Blind in Watertown, Massachusetts, from the age of 5, and graduated in 1967. He then attended Clark University in Worcester, Massachusetts.

Pena was completely blind by the time he was 20.

Musical career
In February 1969, Pena's band played for a week at The Electric Factory in Philadelphia, Pennsylvania, opening twice for both Frank Zappa and The Mothers of Invention and The Grateful Dead. Pena performed in the Contemporary Composer's Workshop at the Newport Folk Festival the same year. He also played in the T-Bone Walker Blues Band during the early 1970s, including an appearance in the Montreux Jazz Festival in 1972. He played bass guitar and provided backup vocals on Bonnie Raitt's debut album.

After moving to San Francisco in 1971, Pena called the Grateful Dead office, which helped find him work. He opened for Jerry Garcia and Merl Saunders at the Keystone in Berkeley and other area clubs many times over the course of the next three years. Pena said of Keystone owner Freddie Herrera, "His idea of an audition was for me to come and open up for Garcia and Saunders. That went on for some time. Whenever he would have somebody, not knowing who would open, he would call me."

Pena's debut album was the self-titled Paul Pena, recorded with guitarist Jeff Baxter, drummer Juma Santos, and former Perkins classmate Ellis Hall on backing vocals, and released by Capitol Records in 1972. His follow-up album New Train was recorded in 1973 by Bearsville Records and was produced by Ben Sidran (keyboardist for the Steve Miller Band). New Train featured Jerry Garcia, Merl Saunders, and The Persuasions. Albert Grossman, the owner of Bearsville Records (and best known as the manager of Bob Dylan), stopped release of the record after a dispute with Pena and his then-manager, Dr. Gunther Weil. Pena remained contractually obligated to Grossman, and was unable to record for another label.

Sidran gave an unreleased copy of New Train to Steve Miller, who recorded "Jet Airliner" with the Steve Miller Band for the 1977 album Book of Dreams. Miller's version of "Jet Airliner" was a hit single, and went to #8 on the charts. Pena's primary source of income in his later years were royalties from that single, which was a song about Pena's airplane trip from Boston to Montreal to play the first-ever date with T-Bone Walker's band.

Pena temporarily suspended his musical career to care for his wife, Babe, who was experiencing kidney failure. She died in 1991.

New Train was finally released in 2000, 27 years after it was recorded.  In 2001 Pena conducted his last tour, playing a number of dates in support of the album.  He opened shows for The String Cheese Incident in March of that year, and for Bob Weir's Ratdog in April.  He was a presenter at the 22nd annual W. C. Handy Awards in May.  He then appeared on Late Night with Conan O'Brien on June 8, 2001, and played "Jet Airliner".

"Gonna Move," a song from New Train, has been covered by a number of artists, including Les Dudek on his 1978 album Ghost Town Parade, Susan Tedeschi on her 2002 album Wait for Me, the Derek Trucks Band on their 2004 album Live at Georgia Theatre, and by Taylor Hicks on 2006's Taylor Hicks.  The Derek Trucks Band also covered Pena's song "Something to Make You Happy" on their 2009 Grammy Award-winning album Already Free.

Throat singing
While searching for a Korean language lesson on shortwave radio on December 29, 1984, Pena was intrigued by an example of Tuvan throat singing he heard on a Radio Moscow broadcast. At the same time he heard an interview with the English musician Jill Purce, one of the pioneers of overtone chanting in the West, on KPFA radio in Berkeley, California, and obtained her recording. Seven years later he found a Tuvan record at a local record store called Tuva: Voices From the Center of Asia, and listened to it "continuously". Based on that record and extended experimentation, he was able to teach himself the vocal techniques called Khoomei, Sygyt and Kargyraa:

Pena also taught himself Tuvan. There were no Tuvan-to-English translation dictionaries, so Pena used two dictionaries: Tuvan-to-Russian and Russian-to-English. He used a device called an Optacon to scan the pages and convert the printed words into tactile sensations he could read with his finger.

Pena attended a performance of Tuvan throat singing at the Asian Art Museum of San Francisco on February 6, 1993. He performed an impromptu Tuvan song in the kargyraa style, which impressed famous Tuvan throatsinger Kongar-ol Ondar. Ondar invited Pena to sing in the second international Khoomei Symposium in 1995 in Kyzyl, Tuva. Pena travelled to Tuva and was the first westerner to compete in the Symposium. He placed first in the Kargyraa contest and also won the "audience favorite" category.

Tuvans affectionately call him "Cher Shimjer" (which means "earthquake"), because of the deepness of his voice. Pena said, "My voice is lower than most Tuvans. They have a style that makes your voice lower. When I use that, there's a slow song when I hit a note that's four white keys from the left of the piano."

The 1999 film Genghis Blues documented Pena's journey to Tuva. It won the 1999 Sundance Film Festival Audience Award for a Documentary. It was also nominated for an Academy Award in 2000 in the Documentary Feature category.

Health issues and death
In 1997 Pena was severely injured after his bedroom caught fire. He suffered from smoke inhalation and was in a coma for four days.

Pena had diabetes. He also waged a long battle with pancreatic illness, and was originally mis-diagnosed with pancreatic cancer. He began chemotherapy treatments and doctors gave him six months to live. In 2000 he was properly diagnosed with pancreatitis, a life-threatening illness.

Pena died in his San Francisco, California, apartment of complications from diabetes and pancreatitis on October 1, 2005.

Discography

Studio albums
Paul Pena, released in 1972 by Capitol Records (re-released in mp3 format in 2011 and available on amazon.com and iTunes)
New Train, recorded in 1973, released in 2000 by Hybrid Recordings
Deep in the Heart of Tuva: Cowboy Music From the Wild East, (various artists) released in 1996 by Ellipsis Arts
Genghis Blues, first released in 1996 by TuvaMuch Records, re-released  with additional tracks in 2000 by Six Degrees Records

Live recordings
Fly Walker Airlines, the T-Bone Walker Blues Band, 1972 by Polydor Records. T-Bone Walker, guitar and vocals; Paul Pena, lead guitar and vocals; Hartley Severns, saxophones and violin; Johnny Summers, bass guitar; Vinnie Johnson, drums. Recorded live at the Montreux Jazz Festival June 17–20, 1972
Stormy Monday, released in 1996, the T-Bone Walker Blues Band, by Delta Music.  This is a bootleg version of the album Fly Walker Airlines taken from the radio broadcast of the concert of June 17, 1972, in Montreux, Switzerland. The CD incorrectly lists a recording date of 1968.
Giant Killers, Big Bones and Paul Pena. Recorded live at the Freight and Salvage Coffee House in Berkeley, California in February 1991.
Delta by the San Francisco Bay, Paul Pena, Alvin Youngblood Hart And Big Bones, 2012 by GangsterBlues.com. Recorded live in August 1991. Available in mp3 format only.

Filmography
Genghis Blues, released in 1999 by Wadi Rum Productions

References

External links
Pena's official web site
Illustrated Paul Pena discography
Genghis Blues film site
Paul Pena page on the Friends of Tuva website

Half-hour 2003 interview with Paul Pena by The Human Chorus, in Real Audio format

1950 births
2005 deaths
People from Hyannis, Massachusetts
Deaths from diabetes
Deaths from pancreatitis
Clark University alumni
American blues guitarists
American male guitarists
Blind musicians
Flamenco musicians
American musicians of Cape Verdean descent
Throat singing
Tuvan music
American blues singer-songwriters
Blues rock musicians
Psychedelic rock musicians
20th-century American guitarists
Guitarists from Massachusetts
20th-century American singers
20th-century American male musicians
American male singer-songwriters
Singer-songwriters from Massachusetts